Sethupathi Higher Secondary School is a school situated in Madurai, Tamilnadu, in India. The school was founded by Baskara Sethupathi (1889–1903).

Notable faculty
Subramaniya Bharatiyar taught at Sethupathi for 11 months before going underground to evade arrest by British authorities. He has been listed as staff list since 1904, having never resigned or been terminated. Bharathi is still on school staff list.

References

https://m.timesofindia.com/city/madurai/Bharathis-school-celebrating-125-years/articleshow/28266981.cms

High schools and secondary schools in Tamil Nadu
Schools in Madurai
Educational institutions in India with year of establishment missing